Alexander Korobolin (born March 12, 1976) is a Russian former ice hockey defenceman.

Korobolin was drafted 100th overall by the New York Rangers in the 1994 NHL Entry Draft. He played with the Rangers' American Hockey League affiliate the Hartford Wolf Pack during the 1999–00 AHL season where he featured in 22 regular season games and scored one goal.

Korobolin also played in the Russian Superleague for HC Mechel, Avangard Omsk, Molot-Prikamye Perm, HC Sibir Novosibirsk.

References

External links

1976 births
Living people
HC Almaty players
Avangard Omsk players
Gazprom-OGU Orenburg players
Hartford Wolf Pack players
Keramin Minsk players
HC Mechel players
Molot-Prikamye Perm players
New York Rangers draft picks
Russian ice hockey defencemen
Saryarka Karagandy players
HC Sibir Novosibirsk players
Sportspeople from Chelyabinsk
Traktor Chelyabinsk players
Yertis Pavlodar players
HC Yugra players